John Sell may refer to:

John Sell (Democrat) (1816–1883), Democratic member of the Wisconsin State Assembly, 1856
John M. Sell (1863–1930), Socialist member of the Wisconsin State Assembly, 1919–1920

See also
John Sell Cotman (1782–1842), English marine and landscape painter, etcher, illustrator and author